Susan Cohen is a Canadian independent film producer, screenwriter and film director.

Cohen is a documentary filmmaker whose work has won numerous awards. In 2007, she was one of eight women selected to attend the American Film Institute's Directing Workshop for Women, where she directed her first short film Open Your Eyes.

Open Your Eyes won the 2008 American Film Institute Jean Picker Firstenberg Award for Excellence, Best Short Film at the Anchorage International Film Festival 2008 including Best Drama, Best Film, and Best Actress for Traci Dinwiddie at the Beverly Hills Shorts Festival 2009. 

Cohen won The Alexis Award for Most Promising Student Filmmaker at the Palm Springs International ShortFest 2008 and Best Director at both the Canada International Film Festival 2009 and Beverly Hills Shorts Festival 2009. Most recently Open Your Eyes was awarded The Jim DeMulling Speak Out Award and Honorable Mention for Best Narrative at the 42nd Humboldt Film Festival 2009. It is also one of 19 films worldwide nominated for Best Short Film at the Milan International Film Festival 2009.

Open Your Eyes is Cohen's first short drama as a writer and director. She is also the producer of the award-winning short films Fueling the Fire and "Animated American", the Chrysler Million Dollar Film Festival finalist Fortune Teller, and the DWW short film Laying Down Arms.

Notes

External links 

 AFI’s Directing Workshop For Women Showcase At Harmony Gold Theatre (Press Release)

Living people
21st-century Canadian screenwriters
Canadian women film directors
Canadian documentary film producers
Canadian women screenwriters
University of Toronto alumni
Canadian women film producers
Year of birth missing (living people)
21st-century Canadian women writers
Canadian documentary film directors